Meiko (めいこ, メイコ) is a feminine Japanese given name.

Possible writings
Mei can be written using different kanji characters and can mean:
 芽子, "sprout, child"
 芽心, "sprout, heart"
 迷子, "lost child"
 姪子, "niece"
 盟子, "alliance, child"
 明子, "bright, child"
 明衣子, "bright, garment, child"
 芽衣子, "sprout, garment, child"
 め以子, "compared with, child"
The name can also be written in hiragana or katakana.

People
 , Japanese actress
 , Japanese actress and singer
 , Japanese actress
 , great grandmother of Emperor Shōwa
 , Japanese manga artist
 , Japanese singer
 , Japanese professional wrestler
 , Japanese professional wrestler
 , Japanese former tarento

Fictional characters
 , a humanoid persona for Yamaha Corporation's vocaloid singing synthesizer application
 , a character in the manga and anime series Marmalade Boy
 , a character in the manga series Kurosaki-kun no Iinari ni Nante Naranai
 , a character in the 2011 Japanese anime series Anohana
 , a character in the manga series Solanin
 , a character in the Digimon media franchise
 , a character in the 2013 Asadora Gochisōsan
 , a character in the adventure game Detective Pikachu
 , a character in the manga series Yamada-kun and the Seven Witches
 , a character in the manga series Prison School

Japanese feminine given names